West Challow is a village and civil parish about  west of the market town of Wantage in the Vale of White Horse. The village is on Childrey Brook, which is a tributary of the River Ock. West Challow was part of Berkshire until the 1974 boundary changes transferred the Vale of White Horse to Oxfordshire. The 2011 Census recorded the parish's population as 184.

Etymology 
The place-name Challow is first attested in a charter of 947 (though the earliest surviving copy of the charter is twelfth-century) in the Old English phrase "to Ceawan Hlewe", which can straightforwardly be translated as "to Ceawa's burial mound", where Ceawa is a personal name attested only here and in the place-name Chawridge. The name appears as Ceveslane (considered to be a mis-spelling of Ceveslaue) in the Domesday Book of 1086. Thirteenth-century variants included Chaulea, Chaulauhe, Chawelawe and Shawelawe.

The "West" element in the name, added to distinguish West Challow from East Challow, is first found in 1284 (in such forms as Westcha(e)lawe and Weschallawe).

Parish church
The Church of England parish church of Saint Laurence is part of the Benefice of Ridgeway, along with the parishes of Childrey, Kingston Lisle, Letcombe Bassett, Letcombe Regis and Sparsholt.

Canal
The course of the former Wilts & Berks Canal passes through the parish, skirting the south side of the village. It was extended eastwards from Longcot to Challow in 1807 and was completed to the River Thames at Abingdon in 1810. The Wilts & Berks carried small amounts of canal cargo through Challow until at least 1895–96. Traffic on the canal had virtually ceased by 1901 and the route was formally abandoned in 1914. The Wilts & Berks Canal Trust is currently restoring the canal.

Manor of Challow
The Manor of Challow was granted by King Henry I to Robert Achard between 1107 and 1118, and passed later to  Sir William Forster who held it in the early 17th century. Manor Farm is a Grade II* listed Queen Anne building with much older inclusions which is currently used to provide bed and breakfast accommodation.

References

Sources

External links

Civil parishes in Oxfordshire
Vale of White Horse
Villages in Oxfordshire